The Confluence Trail, part of the Madison County, Illinois Transit (MCT) bikeways network, is a  bike trail between Granite City and Alton, Illinois's Russell Commons Park. The majority of the trail is paved asphalt on top of the Mississippi River levee system. The trail is part of the St. Louis metro area's Confluence Greenway.

Background

The Lewis and Clark Confluence Tower is also located directly on the trail.

References

Bike paths in Illinois
Tourist attractions in Madison County, Illinois